Shuaib Al-Harbi (born 9 June 1996) is an Emirati footballer who plays as a midfielder, most recently for Al Dhafra.

Career
Al-Harbi started his career at Al Dhafra. is constantly playing with the Al Dhafra U21, On 4 December 2018,  Al-Harbi made his professional debut for Al-Dhafra against Al-Jazira in the Pro League, replacing Suhail Al-Mansoori .

Career statistics

Club

Notes

References

External links 
 

1998 births
Living people
Emirati footballers
Association football midfielders
Al Dhafra FC players
UAE Pro League players